This is a List of 1,085 Early Christian saints— saints before 450 AD— in alphabetical order by Christian name.

Wikipedia contains a calendar of saints listed by the day of the year on which they are traditionally venerated, as well as a Chronological list of saints and blesseds, listed by their date of death.

Alphabetical list

See also 

List of saints
List of canonizations, for a list of Catholic canonizations by date
Calendar of saints
Doctor of the Church
Patron saint
Martyrology
Roman Martyrology
Saint symbolism
List of beatified people
List of venerated Catholics
List of Servants of God
Saints in Anglicanism
Saints in Methodism

References

External links 
Catholic Online list of saints
List of all Catholic Saints by GCatholic.org
Catholic Forum patron saint index
Church of England Common Worship calendar
Coptic Saints Galleries at http://St-Takla.org
The Prologue from Ohrid, a collection of brief lives of Orthodox saints along with brief homilies and meditations.
Hagiographies, hymnography, and icons for many Orthodox saints from the website of the Orthodox Church in America.

Early Christian